2002 Czech Lion Awards ceremony was held on 8 March 2004.

Winners and nominees

Non-statutory Awards

References

2003 film awards
Czech Lion Awards ceremonies